Nicholas Serracino (1877–1934), AIA, was an American architect active in late-nineteenth- and early twentieth-century New York City. He was principally noted for his designs of churches and parish schools for the Roman Catholic Archdiocese of New York.

He designed St. Jean Baptiste Church and Rectory (1910), one of few Catholic churches in city with a dome and the only one besides St. Patrick's Cathedral (New York City) to have stained glass made in Chartres. This won a prize in an international competition. This was followed by the more modest brick temple-fronted Church of the Sacred Hearts of Mary and Jesus (New York City), built in 1915 for $35,000 and demolished in 2007. His office was located at 1170 Broadway.

Works
St. Clare Church (Manhattan) (1907)
St. Jean Baptiste Church and Rectory (1910)
St. Ann's Church (East Harlem) (1913)
Church of the Sacred Hearts of Mary and Jesus (New York City) (1915)

References

External links
 

American ecclesiastical architects
Beaux Arts architects
Architects from New York City
Architects of Roman Catholic churches
American people of Italian descent
20th-century American architects
1877 births
1934 deaths